KCRX-FM (102.3 FM) is a radio station  broadcasting a Classic rock format. Licensed to Seaside, Oregon, United States.  The station is currently owned by New Northwest Broadcasters, LLC.

The station is an affiliate of the syndicated Pink Floyd program "Floydian Slip."

History
The station was assigned the call sign KULU on October 6, 1995.  On August 28, 2000, the station changed its call sign to KCRX-FM.

References

External links

CRX-FM
Seaside, Oregon
Classic rock radio stations in the United States
Radio stations established in 1998
1998 establishments in Oregon